Cape Canaveral may refer to:

 Cape Canaveral, a headland in Florida
 Cape Canaveral Space Force Station, a U.S. Space Force spaceport on the cape.
 Cape Canaveral, Florida, USA; a city on the cape.
 John F. Kennedy Space Center (KSC), Merritt Island, Florida, USA; a spaceport neighboring Cape Canaveral Space Force Station, sometimes referred to as 'Cape Canaveral'
 Spaceport Florida, the commercial spaceport operated by Florida through Space Florida on the Space Coast
 Space Coast, Florida, USA; the general region containing the cape
 Shuttle Landing Facility (airport) KSC, Florida; sometimes referred to as 'Cape Canaveral'

See also